Supersized is the debut studio album of drum & bass DJ, producer and musician Danny Byrd. It was released on 26 May 2008 through Hospital Records.

Singles
 "Shock Out" was the first single released from the album, it was released on 4 February 2008.
 "From Bath With Love" was the second single released from the album, it was released on 28 July 2008.
 "Red Mist" was the third single released from the album, it was released on 26 June 2009.

Track listing

Release history

References

2008 debut albums
Danny Byrd albums
Hospital Records albums